William Bernard (c. 1603 - March 31, 1665) was a merchant from the Kingdom of England who became a planter and politician in the Colony of Virginia.

Early and family life
Bernard was the third of four sons born to Mary Woolhouse Bernard and her husband Sir Francis Barnard. Although their first son died as an infant, his brother Robert Barnard would inherit Bampton Hall in Huntindonshire. The family surname has several spelling variations.

Career
William first sailed to the Virginia Colony in 1621, abord the 'Furtherance' and settled at Basse's Choice in what is now Isle of Wight County. He traveled back and forth between the colony and England at least four times in the next twenty years. He took an oath to become a member of the Governor's Council on March 8, 1642.

He married the widow Lucy Higgonsen Burwell, whose husband Lewis Burwell I had vast acreages of land in the Tidewater region, but who died when his son and heir, Lewis Burwell II, was an infant. Thus, Bernard was responsible for raising the child, as well as administering the lands he had inherited until he reached legal age. Bernard thus moved to the main Burwell plantation in GLoucester County. Bernard and also had a son by his wife Lucy, as well as two daughters.

Death and legacy
However, Bernard never saw his ward nor children reach adulthood, for he died on March 31, 1665. He was buried at the Burwell family burying ground. Both his daughters would name sons to honor him.

References

1600s births
 1665 deaths
Merchants from the Kingdom of England
English emigrants